The men's snowboard cross competition in snowboarding at the 2023 Winter World University Games will be held on 12 & 13 January at Gore Mountain.

Results

Seeding run
The seeding run will be held on 12 January at 13:17.

Round Robin

Elimination round

Semifinals

Heat 1

Heat 2

Finals
Small final

Big final

References

Men's snowboard cross